Visa-Bikar 2009 is the 50th season of the Icelandic national football cup. It began on 22 May 2009 and ended with the final on 3 October 2009 at Laugardalsvöllur. The winners qualified for the second qualifying round of the 2010–11 UEFA Europa League.

First round
The First Round consists of 32 teams from lower Icelandic divisions. The matches were played between 23 and 25 May 2009.

|colspan="3" style="background-color:#97DEFF"|23 May 2009

|-
|colspan="3" style="background-color:#97DEFF"|24 May 2009

|-
|colspan="3" style="background-color:#97DEFF"|25 May 2009

|}

Second round
The Second Round includes the 16 winners from the previous round as well as 24 teams from the second and third division. The matches were played on 1 and 2 June 2009.

|colspan="3" style="background-color:#97DEFF"|1 June 2009

|-
|colspan="3" style="background-color:#97DEFF"|2 June 2009

|}

Third round
The Third Round include the 20 winners from the previous round and the 12 teams from the Úrvalsdeild. These matches were played on 17 and 18 June 2009.

|colspan="3" style="background-color:#97DEFF"|17 June 2009

|-
|colspan="3" style="background-color:#97DEFF"|18 June 2009

|}

Fourth round
This round consists of the 16 winners of the previous round. These matches were played on 5 and 6 July 2009.

|colspan="3" style="background-color:#97DEFF"|5 July 2009

|-
|colspan="3" style="background-color:#97DEFF"|6 July 2009

|}

Quarterfinals
This round consists of the 8 winners of the previous round.

Semifinals
The semifinal matches took place at Laugardalsvöllur on 12 and 13 September 2009 and involved the four winners from the previous round.

Final
The Final took place at Laugardalsvöllur on 3 October 2009 and was contested between the winners of the Semifinal matches.

External links
 Official site 

2009 in Icelandic football
2009 domestic association football cups
2009